In The Cold Dark Night is a 2020 American documentary film about the murder of Timothy Coggins in Spalding County, Georgia in 1983 and the Coggins family's subsequent 35-year quest for justice. The project was nominated for a 2021 News & Documentary Emmy Award for Outstanding Writing: Documentary. The film was also nominated for the Oglethorpe Award for Excellence in Georgia Cinema by the Georgia Film Critics Association.

The film premiered in the USA as a special event on 20/20 on July 17, 2020 and on Hulu immediately after. It has aired in the UK on Sky Documentaries since October 8, 2020.

Production

Filming commenced in Griffin, Georgia and Spalding County, Georgia in January, 2018. The trials of the two men accused of murdering Timothy Coggins occurred in July and August, 2018.

In the Cold Dark Night received a grant from The Rogovy Foundation's Miller/Packan Documentary Film Fund for the summer of 2020.

Reception
Executive Producer Wesley Lowery wrote a widely shared article about the story behind the film in GQ. Additionally, the Nieman Foundation for Journalism at Harvard discussed the film, comparing the process of working on the film with the process of writing an article about the same topic.

References

External links
 
 Watch 20/20 Season 42 Episode 30 In the Cold Dark Night Online
 In the Cold Dark Night
 42nd Annual News & Documentary Nominations – The Emmys
 In the Cold Dark Night
 Story of Timothy Coggins’ murder nominated for Emmy Award - The Pike County Journal-Reporter 
 Emmy-nominated producer and director recognises Oxford Saïd education | Saïd Business School
 In The Cold Dark Night - Murder of a Black Man in Georgia - Documentary

2020 films
2020 documentary films
American documentary films
British documentary films
Documentary films about lawyers
Films about lawyers
Films about miscarriage of justice
Films set in Georgia (U.S. state)
Sky UK original programming
2020s English-language films
2020s American films
2020s British films